Geoffrey of Sergines, sometimes known as Geoffroy of Sargines (c. 1205 – April 1269), was a French knight who served as seneschal and regent of the Kingdom of Jerusalem.

References 
 Christopher Marshall: Warfare in the Latin East, 1192–1291 (Cambridge Studies in Medieval Life and Thought. Ser. 4, 17). Cambridge University Press, Cambridge 1994, .
 Jonathan Riley-Smith: What were the Crusades? 3rd edition. Palgrave Macmillan, Basingstoke 2002, .
 

1205 births
1269 deaths
13th-century people of the Kingdom of Jerusalem
13th-century viceregal rulers
Christians of the Sixth Crusade
Christians of the Seventh Crusade
Regents of Jerusalem